Linhart is a surname. Notable people with the surname include:

Alan Linhart (born 1975), U.S. musician (see Cereal Killaz)
Anton Tomaž Linhart (1756–1795), Carniolan playwright and historian
Buzzy Linhart (1943–2020), U.S. rock performer and musician
Carl Linhart (1929–2022), U.S. baseball player
Evžen Linhart (1898–1949), Czech architect and furniture designer
Pedro Linhart (born 1962), Spanish golfer
Tamir Linhart (born 1968), Israeli and U.S. Continental Indoor Soccer League player
Tomas Linhart (born 1984), Czech ice hockey player
Toni Linhart (1942–2013), Austrian and American football player
Wenzel von Linhart (1821–1877), Austrian surgeon
Zdeněk Linhart (born 1994), Czech footballer

See also
Lienhardt
Lienhart
Lienhard
Linhardt

sl:Linhart